Lathrocasis is a monotypic genus of flowering plants belonging to the family Polemoniaceae. The only species is Lathrocasis tenerrima.

Its native range is Western Canada to Western Central USA.

References

Polemoniaceae
Polemoniaceae genera
Monotypic Ericales genera